Kassey is a name. People with the name include:

Surname
Moussa Seybou Kassey (1959-2020), Nigerien politician
Adnan El Kassey (born 1939), Iraqi professional wrestler

Given name
Kassey Kallman (born 1992), American footballer

See also
Mamar Kassey, Nigerian band named after legendary warrior